Hira Singh (18 December 1843 – 24 December 1911) was the ruler of Nabha State, one of the Phulkian states in the Punjab.

Early life
Hira Singh was born at Badrukhan, Jind, on 18 December 1843  , the second son of Sukha Singh (died 1852), from a distant branch of the royal Sikh Phulkian dynasty of Patiala, Jind and Nabha. Little is known about his early life.

The throne of Nabha

In 1871, the line of the Phulkian dynasty which had ruled Nabha, a small 11-gun state, since 1718 became extinct upon the death from tuberculosis of the young Raja, Bhagwan Singh (1842–1871). The remaining two lines of the dynasty-the rulers of Patiala and Jind-in conjunction with the British government fixed upon Hira Singh Gosal as the successor to the Nabha gadi (throne). Hira Singh ascended the throne of Nabha on 9 June 1871 and began a long and successful reign that would usher Nabha into the modern era. Great monuments and public buildings were erected, roads, railways, hospitals, schools and palaces were constructed and an efficient modern army was established that saw service during the Second Afghan War and the Tirah Expedition. As well, agriculture flourished with the construction of an irrigation canal at Sirhind, and Nabha soon produced bountiful harvests of wheat, sugar, pulses, millet and cotton, thus enabling the state to increase the value of its land revenue assessments.

As a result of Hira Singh's improvements, in 1877 Nabha was raised to a salute of 13-guns and Hira Singh himself was decorated with the Empress of India Gold Medal and knighted two years later with the GCSI.

Later years

In 1894, Hira Singh was granted the title of Raja-i-Rajagan and in 1898 was granted a 15-gun personal salute. He received the honorary rank of Colonel in the Army and was appointed a Knight Grand Commander of the Order of the Indian Empire (GCIE) in the 1903 Durbar Honours on 1 January 1903. He was made a Colonel of the 14th King George's Own Ferozepore Sikhs in the British Indian Army in 1904. Only a fortnight before his death, Hira Singh was raised to the rank of Maharaja of Nabha. Hira Singh died at the Hira Mahal on Christmas Eve 1911, aged 68 after a four-decade reign. He was succeeded by his only son, Ripudaman Singh Gosal.

Family
Hira Singh married four times and had two children, a son and a daughter
1. Karangarhwalia; married in 1858
2. Aonanliwali Rani ;
3. Jasmir Kaur (d 1921). Married in 1880 and had one son and one daughter:
Ripaduman Singh, who succeeded to the Nabha throne as Maharaja Ripudaman Singh (1883–1942); r. 1911-1928.
Ripudaman Devi (1881–1911); married Ram Singh
4.wife; Khachedu bai

Honours
Prince of Wales gold medal-1876
Empress of India Medal-1877
Knight Grand Commander of the Order of the Star of India (GCSI)-1879
Knight Grand Commander of the Order of the Indian Empire (GCIE)-1903
Delhi Durbar gold medal-1903
Delhi Durbar gold medal-1911

References

People from British India
Indian Sikhs
Jat rulers
Punjabi people
British Indian Army officers
Knights Grand Commander of the Order of the Star of India
Knights Grand Commander of the Order of the Indian Empire
1843 births
1911 deaths
Maharajas of Nabha